Dvorichanskyi National Park is a national park in Ukraine, on the right bank of the Oskil river, in Eastern Ukraine. It was created in 2009, as a result of a presidential decree. The park is located in Kupiansk Raion, Kharkiv Oblast, near the Russian border. It covers 3,131 hectares of state-owned land.

Topography
The territory has dissected topography, with many valleys and slopes.

Flora and Fauna
The limestone rock and soils of the chalk steppe creates a unique ecosystem. The park is the habitat of plant species including Artemisia nutans, Artemisia salsoloides, Artemisia hololeuca, Hyssopus cretaceus, Scrophularia cretacea, Matthiola fragrans, Linum usitatissimum, and Androsace koso-poljanskii. 30% of the plant species are endemic to the area. 

The park is home to a number of Marmot colonies.

References

External links

National parks of Ukraine
Parks in Ukraine
Protected areas established in 2009
2009 establishments in Ukraine